Susan Hogan may refer to:

Susan Hogan (actress) (born 1951), Canadian actress
Susan Hogan (historian) (born 1961), Scottish cultural historian, academic and author